Susan Buchanan (born 6 January 1952) is a Canadian gymnast. She competed at the 1972 Summer Olympics.

References

External links
 

1952 births
Living people
Canadian female artistic gymnasts
Olympic gymnasts of Canada
Gymnasts at the 1972 Summer Olympics
Sportspeople from Ottawa